Sushirrito is a fast casual restaurant chain that started in San Francisco in January 2011. The main distinction is the titular "sushirrito", a blend of traditional sushi with the form of a burrito, with the intent of portability. As of December 2017, it has 8 locations in the San Francisco Bay Area.

Food
Sushirrito does not offer customizability in its food. Soy sauce and wasabi are also not offered.

In the San Francisco Bay area, Sushirrito receives its fish from Royal Hawaiian Seafood, which sources its fish based on the Monterey Bay Aquarium’s Seafood Watch's sustainability criteria and research.

References

Restaurant chains
Restaurants in San Francisco
American fusion cuisine
Sushi restaurants in the United States